Francine Gaudet is a Canadian former politician in the province of Quebec. She was a Quebec Liberal Party Member of the National Assembly of Quebec from 2003 to 2007, and the federal Liberal Party candidate for Berthier—Maskinongé in the 2011 federal election.

Background

She was born on May 30, 1948 in Sainte-Gertrude, Centre-du-Québec and is an educator.

She ran as a Liberal candidate in the provincial district of Maskinongé in the 2003 provincial election and won, defeating PQ incumbent Rémy Désilets.

She served as Parliamentary Assistant from 2003 to 2007. In the 2007 election, she lost re-election against ADQ candidate Jean Damphousse.

Election results

References

External links 
 

1948 births
Living people
Quebec Liberal Party MNAs
Women MNAs in Quebec
Candidates in the 2011 Canadian federal election
Quebec candidates for Member of Parliament
21st-century Canadian women politicians
Liberal Party of Canada candidates for the Canadian House of Commons